Iaat ( also transliterated as Ya'ad, Yaad, Yaat, or Iaad) is a town and municipality located approximately 5 kilometers northwest of Baalbek, in the Beqaa Valley of Lebanon. The town is famed for its Corinthian column, the Iaat column. This is a single column of unknown date (but probably dated from Roman times), approximately half way between Baalbek and Qasr el Banat, with a cartouche on the 6th drum but no inscription.

History
Ottoman tax registers between 1533–1548 indicate the village had 180 households and 4 bachelors, all Muslims.

The town also has a Christian minority.

Iaat column
The column stands 18 meters (59.1 feet) and is installed on a four-step base.  The location of the Pillar is 4 miles (6 km) northwest of the Baalbek ruins, between the towns of Baalbek and Chlifa.  At one point, a plaque was installed on the northern side of the monument. However, it has been removed and no other history is known of the column.  The column is believed in local legend to be related to Helena, mother of Constantine I.

George F. Taylor classified it among a group of temples of the Beqaa Valley and noticed that the position of the Iaat column was equidistant between the temples of Baalbek and Qasr el Banat. Whilst technically not being a temple, Taylor suggested that the column might have been placed by the Romans where it is as a victory column to mark the site of a great ancient battle. He also noted a cartouche on the sixth cylinder of the column.

See also
Heliopolis in Phoenicia
Qasr el Banat
Roman Phoenicia

References

Bibliography

External links
Iaat at localiban.org 
Iaat at cartage.org.lb (archived link)
Iaat at middleeast.com

Archaeological sites in Lebanon
Monuments and memorials in Lebanon
Roman archaeology
Beqaa Valley